John William Marshall (born July 6, 1958) served as Secretary of Public Safety in the Cabinet of Virginia Governor Tim Kaine from 2006 to 2010, and Governor Mark Warner from 2002 to 2006, and was the longest-serving member of the Virginia Governor's Cabinet.

Prior to becoming Virginia Secretary of Public Safety in January 2002, Marshall served in the Virginia State Police from 1980 to 1994, where he was assigned as a State Trooper, Narcotics Division Special Agent, Training Academy Instructor, and Field Operations Sergeant. From 1994 to 1999, he served as United States Marshal for the Eastern District of Virginia. In 1999, he was appointed as the first African-American Director of the United States Marshals Service by President Bill Clinton, serving in that post until 2001. His educational background includes a B.A. in government from Georgetown University, and a Post-Baccalaureate Certificate in Administration of Justice from Virginia Commonwealth University.

Following his resignation as Virginia Secretary of Public Safety in January 2010, Marshall served as a consultant and senior advisor to the Thurgood Marshall College Fund until January 2011, and subsequently became a public speaker on topics including criminal justice and civil rights.

Marshall is the son of Thurgood Marshall, the first African American U.S. Supreme Court Justice, and Cecilia Suyat Marshall, his Filipino American mother. He is also the brother of Thurgood Marshall Jr., former Secretary to the Cabinet in the Clinton administration. He is not related to Supreme Court justice John Marshall.

References

External links
Virginia Secretary of Public Safety Archived Web Site, 2005-2006 part of Virginia's Political Landscape, Fall 2005 Web Archive Collection at Virginia Memory
Virginia Secretary of Public Safety Archived Web Site, 2006-2010 part of Governor Tim Kaine Administration, 2006-2010 Web Archive Collection at Virginia Memory
A Guide to the Records of the Virginia Office of the Secretary of Public Safety, 2000-2006 (bulk 2002-2005) at The Library of Virginia

1958 births
Living people
Thurgood Marshall
State cabinet secretaries of Virginia
Virginia Democrats
United States Marshals
Clinton administration personnel
Politicians from Manhattan
African Americans in law enforcement
African-American people in Virginia politics
African-American state cabinet secretaries
American state police officers
American politicians of Filipino descent
Asian-American people in Virginia politics
Georgetown University alumni
Virginia Commonwealth University alumni